In Jewish mythology, a  (from the Hebrew verb   meaning 'adhere' or 'cling') is a malicious possessing spirit believed to be the dislocated soul of a dead person. It supposedly leaves the host body once it has accomplished its goal, sometimes after being exorcised.

Etymology
 comes from the Hebrew word  , meaning 'a case of attachment', which is a nominal form derived from the verb   'to adhere' or 'cling'. It is an abbreviation of the phrase   ('a cleavage of an evil spirit'), or else   ('dibbuk from the outside'), which is found in man.

History
The term first appears in a number of 16th-century writings, though it was ignored by mainstream scholarship until S. Ansky's 1920 play The Dybbuk popularised the concept in literary circles. Earlier accounts of possession (such as that given by Josephus) were of demonic possession rather than that of ghosts. These accounts advocated orthodoxy among the populace as a preventative measure. For example, it was suggested that a sloppily made mezuzah or entertaining doubt about Moses' crossing of the Red Sea opened one's household to  possession.

Rabbi Yoel Teitelbaum, the Satmar rebbe (1887–1979), is reported to have supposedly advised an individual said to be possessed to consult a psychiatrist.

Traditionally, dybbuks tended to be male spirits who possessed women on the eve of their weddings typically in a sexual fashion by entering the women through their vaginas which is seen in Ansky's play.

Ansky's play is a significant work of Yiddish theatre, and has been adapted a number of times by writers, composers, and other creators including Jerome Robbins/Leonard Bernstein and Tony Kushner. In the play, a young bride is possessed by the ghost of the man she was meant to marry, had her father not broken a marriage agreement.

There are other forms of soul transmigration in Jewish mythology. This is always done with consent, so that the soul can perform a mitzvah. The  (literally 'rolling') puts forth the idea that a soul must live through many lives before it gains the wisdom to rejoin with God.

In the psychological literature, the  has been described as a hysterical syndrome.

In popular culture

Film
's 1937 film The Dybbuk, based on the Yiddish play by S. Ansky, is considered one of the classics of Yiddish filmmaking.

The  was featured as the main antagonist in the horror films The Unborn (2009), The Possession (2012), and Ezra (2017). Ezra, an Indian Malayalam-language film by Jay K, revolves around a dybbuk box, with references to Kabbalist traditions and occultism. It was remade in Hindi as Dybbuk (2021).

In the 1996 movie Waiting for Guffman Eugene Levy's character, Allan Pearl references a fictious play "Dybbuk, Schmybbuk, I said 'More Ham'"

Marcin Wrona's Demon is the story of a groom possessed by a  the night before his wedding.

The  was the main antagonist in the short film Dibbuk (2019) directed by Dayan D. Oualid. The film deals with an exorcism within the Parisian Jewish community.

The  possesses a recliner in the comedy-horror film Killer Sofa (2019), which causes it to commit murders.

Music
The background score for the 2017 Indian film Ezra contains a track titled "Dybbuk", an instrumental piece composed by Sushin Shyam. In March 2020, the horror punk band Voice of Doom released the song The Dybbuk on the album Horror Punks USA Quarantine Compilation 2020, Volume 1.

Print

The  appears in the novel, The Inquisitor's Apprentice (2011) by Chris Moriarty.

Richard Zimler's 2011 novel The Warsaw Anagrams is narrated by a  desperately trying to understand why he has remained in our world. This is in keeping with kabbalistic belief that  fail to pass over to the Other Side because of a mitzvah or duty that they have failed to fulfill. According to the review in the San Francisco Chronicle, Zimler's novel, "Deserves a place among the most important works of Holocaust literature."

In the Children of the Lamp series by P.B. Kerr, there is a highly mischievous character named Dybbuk. Like all djinn, Dybbuk has the ability to possess mundanes, or non-djinn humans.

Television
Sidney Lumet directed "The Dybbuk", an episode of The Play of the Week based on the play by S. Ansky adapted into English by Joseph Liss. It aired on October 3, 1960.

The " Box" was shown on the first episode of Deadly Possessions (spin-off of Ghost Adventures), in which the son of the relative of a Holocaust survivor recounts the tale of the ' alleged involvement in the deaths surrounding the box.

Two  boxes were shown in the fourth and final episode of Ghost Adventures: Quarantine in which Zak Bagans opens both boxes resulting in him acting strangely aggressive towards other members of the crew.

In a later episode titled "The Devil to Pay", the Ghostbusters deal with a demon named Dib Devlin, who swindles Ray Stanz and Winston Zeddemore into selling their souls to compete in his game show.

The  later inhabits a puppet of Martin Stein. By the end of the next episode, "Mike the Spike" is subdued by the Legends and detained at the Time Bureau.

Theater
A review of the innovative approaches to the subject was presented by EgoPo Classic Theater in English translation from the Yiddish, as penned by Joachim Neugroschel and adapted by Tony Kushner, the production directed by Lane Savadove. Containing detailed background information on the history of the dybbuk, "'Don't ask me what happened. It’s best not to know!': A DYBBUK, or Between two worlds" the article was first published by All About Jewish Theatre the world's largest English-language Jewish theater website, before its demise in 2014, but recently rescued by Drama Around the Globe and republished by Phindie.

See also 
  box
 Kabbalah

References

Further reading
 J. H. Chajes, Between Worlds: Dybbuks, Exorcists, and Early Modern Judaism, University of Pennsylvania Press, Aug 31, 2011.
 Rachel Elior, Dybbuks and Jewish Women in Social History, Mysticism and Folklore, Urim Publications, 1 Sep 2008.
 Fernando Peñalosa, The Dybbuk: Text, Subtext, and Context.  Jan 2013.
 Fernando Peñalosa. Parodies of An-sky's The Dybbuk.  Nov 2012
 Yosl Cutler, "The Dybbuk in the Form of a Crisis", In Geveb, March 2017.

External links
 "The Dybbuk" by Ansky Jewish Heritage Online Magazine
 "Dybbuk—Spiritual Possession and Jewish Folklore" by Jeff Belanger, Ghostvillage.com
 "Dybbuk", Encyclopædia Britannica
 Dibbuk short film teaser
 ডিব্বুক (Dybbuk) - Bengali horror fiction based on Dybbuk myth  by Tamoghna Naskar. Publisher - Aranyamon Prokashoni https://www.aranyamon.com/

Ghosts
Jewish folklore
Jewish legendary creatures
Jewish mysticism
Supernatural legends
Yiddish words and phrases
Yiddish-language folklore
Spirit possession